Irissarry is a commune in the Pyrénées-Atlantiques department and Nouvelle-Aquitaine region of south-western France.

It is located in the former province of Lower Navarre.

See also
Communes of the Pyrénées-Atlantiques department

References

External links

 IRISARRI in the Bernardo Estornés Lasa - Auñamendi Encyclopedia (Euskomedia Fundazioa) (in Spanish)

Communes of Pyrénées-Atlantiques
Lower Navarre
Pyrénées-Atlantiques communes articles needing translation from French Wikipedia